Recep Ünalan (born 9 April 1990 in Kayseri, Turkey) is a Turkish former cyclist, who was the junior Turkish National Road Race Championships winner in 2006, 2007 and 2008. He competed at the 2010 UCI Road World Championships in Melbourne.

Major results

2006
 1st  Road race, National Junior Road Championships
2007
 1st  Road race, National Junior Road Championships
2008
 1st  Road race, National Junior Road Championships
2011
 1st Overall Tour of Gallipoli
1st Stages 2 & 3
 9th Overall Tour of Isparta
1st Stage 3
 10th ZLM Tour
2012
 9th Overall Tour of Trakya
2013
 1st  Road race, Balkan Road Championships
 4th Classic Beograd–Čačak
2015
 5th Overall Tour of Çanakkale
1st Stage 2
 5th Overall Tour of Aegean
2016
 National Road Championships
3rd Road race
4th Time trial

References

External links

Turkish male cyclists
Living people
1990 births
People from Kayseri
21st-century Turkish people